Countess of Harewood is the title given to the wife of the Earl of Harewood. Women who have held the title are:

Florence Lascelles, Countess of Harewood (1859-1943)
Mary, Princess Royal and Countess of Harewood (1897-1965)
Marion Stein (1926-2014)
Patricia Lascelles, Countess of Harewood (1926-2018)
Diane Lascelles, Countess of Harewood (born 1956; present incumbent)